Odašiljači i veze d.o.o. (OiV) is a Croatian limited liability company (društvo s ograničenom odgovornošću), terrestrial television and WiMAX operator born from the separation from Hrvatska Radiotelevizija in 2001.

Croatia started to test DVB-T transmission on June 13, 2002. The systems transmitted 4 national TV channels at that time (HRT 1, HRT 2, HRT 3 and Nova TV). Odašiljači i veze built a network of 9 transmitters, completed in 2007 and covering about 70% of the country. Analogue broadcasting stopped in October 2010.

Currently, as of December 2013, it transmits 11 national channels (HRT 1, HRT 2, HRT 3, HRT 4, RTL Televizija, RTL 2, RTL Kockica, Nova TV, Doma TV, SPTV and CMC), as well as regional services.

References

Television networks in Croatia
Telecommunications companies of Croatia
Companies established in 2001
2001 establishments in Croatia